Boddington is a village and parish near Cheltenham. The population taken at the 2011 census was 266.  It is home to RAF Boddington.

References

External links

Villages in Gloucestershire
Borough of Tewkesbury